Yasmine Belkaid (born 1968) is an Algerian immunologist and senior investigator at the National Institute of Allergy and Infectious Diseases (NIAID) and adjunct professor at the University of Pennsylvania. She is best known for her work studying host-microbe interactions in tissues and immune regulation to microbes. Belkaid currently serves as the director of the NIAID Microbiome program.

Early life and education 
Belkaid was born and raised in Algiers, Algeria. She received her bachelor's and master's degrees in biochemistry from the University of Sciences and Technology Houari Boumediene as well as a Master of Advanced Studies from University of Paris-Sud. She earned her doctorate in immunology from the Pasteur Institute in 1996, where she studied innate immune responses to Leishmania infection.

Career

Academia 
Following graduate school, she moved to the United States for a postdoctoral fellowship at NIAID's Laboratory of Parasitic Diseases. In 2002, she joined the faculty of the Division of Molecular Immunology in Cincinnati Children's Hospital Medical Center before returning to NIAID in 2005 as a tenure-track investigator in the Laboratory of Parasitic Diseases. In 2008, she became adjunct Professor of Pathology and Laboratory Medicine at the University of Pennsylvania.

Research 
Belkaid's research focuses on untangling the mechanisms underlying host-microbe interactions in the gastrointestinal tract and on the skin, which are natural barrier sites between the host's inner workings and their external environment. This also includes the role microbiota play in promoting immunity against infection against other harmful pathogens. Her group has contributed to the scientific understanding of how the host immune system can distinguish good microbes from the bad.

Belkaid's research also led to the discovery of certain skin microbes that play an important role in immune defense. They carried out this experiment using mice that had no naturally-occurring microbes in their skin or gut so they could colonize those mice with only one strain of "good" bacteria. They then infected the colonized and bacteria-free mice with a parasite and found that those without the "good" bacteria were unable to fight back against the parasite, while those with the bacteria mounted an effective immune response. Her team has also found that beneficial bacteria living on the surface of the skin can also accelerate wound healing in mice. Belkaid's group also studies what happens when there are imbalances in our microbiome. Belkaid's research has advanced scientific understanding of how shifts in microbiota can contribute to disease, particularly chronic inflammatory diseases like Crohn's disease and Psoriasis.

Awards and honors 

 2013 – Gold Medal, International Union of Biochemistry and Molecular Biology 
 2016 – Sanofi-Pasteur International Mid-career Award 
 2016 – Elected Fellow, American Academy of Microbiology
 2017 – Emil von Behring Prize 
 2017 – Elected to the National Academy of Sciences
 2018 – Elected to the National Academy of Medicine
 2019 – Lurie Prize in Biomedical Sciences, Foundation for the National Institutes of Health
 2020 – Elected to the American Academy of Arts and Sciences
 2021 – Robert Koch Prize

References 

1968 births
Algerian women scientists
Algerian scientists
Algerian emigrants to the United States
National Institutes of Health faculty
University of Pennsylvania faculty
Members of the United States National Academy of Sciences
French microbiologists
Living people
Members of the National Academy of Medicine
People from Algiers
Fellows of the American Academy of Arts and Sciences
Fellows of the American Academy of Microbiology